Umarji Anuradha (Telugu: ఉమర్జీ అనూరాధ) is an Indian writer known for her works in Telugu cinema and journalism. She wrote continuously on The Legends of Indian Cinema (Vendi Tera Nirdeshakulu, వెండి తెర నిర్దేశకులు) for Sitara Film Weekly Magazine, the largest circulated Telugu film weekly in India. She also wrote number of dramas for All India Radio and television channels, for daily serials like Pelli Chesukundamra, for E TV., Vaisaali Serial for Zee Telugu and Gharshna serial for E TV. She was also the winner of Akkineni Abhinandana Award for Best Dialogue Writer of the year 2010 and Super Hit Film Weekly Award Super Hit Film Weekly Magazine, for the blockbuster movie, Ye Maaya Chesave.

Early life 
Umarji Anuradha was born to a Marathi-speaking Madhva family. Since her paternal uncle, Kuppu Rao Srinivasa Rao,(Peda Naanna) worked for the railways as station master, she had her schooling in Vijayawada, Krishna district, Andhra Pradesh and in Mangalagiri, a small but traditionally religiously popular town in Guntur District known for a Panakala Narasimha swamy temple. While continuing her studies, she also continued her habit of drama writing from school days to post-graduation. She was born to G. Nagarajan and Vemaganti Susheela and grew up for some time with Kuppu Rao Nagubai and Kuppu Rao Srinivasa Rao, a railway station master. She was born in the midst of a well-educated, sensible family with a literary background, and started writing from her childhood. Her mother Vemaganti Suseela was also a writer and an Artist of All India Radio Madras. She served as English teacher in the 'Kendriya Vidyalaya' a Central School, Government of India, in Chennai. She has an excellent track record of writing talent and literary taste.

Career

Journalism
She started her career as a contributor for Eenadu News Daily in Chennai along with her husband, PhD., Research Scholar K.V. Sridhar Kumar, who worked as a photo journalist for Eenadu. Later he joined with film director Padma Shri P. Bharathi Raja, for learning and understanding the job of Film Direction. He was awarded Doctorate, for his out standing PhD Research work by the Governor of Tamil Nadu, in Chennai 2005. Later Dr. K.V. Sridhar Kumar changed his name as Gautham Kashyap for the Screen. Umarji Anuradha was recognized as the first woman staff reporter for Eenadu News Daily. She worked as an in-charge for the Eenadu Tamil Nadu edition. Later, since her husband Gautham Kashyap ( Dr. K.V. Sridhar Kumar) was absorbed as Film Script writer in Ramoji Film City, for Usha kiran Movies Films Division, she was transferred to Hyderabad. Umarji Anuradha wrote many articles, columns, features on various film personalities for Eenadu Cinema Page and Sitara Film Magazine on the name of Umarji Kumaran Kumaran is another pen name of Dr. K.V. Sridhar Kumar. Later she was promoted as desk in charge for Maharashtra Desk. She went on a special assignment to establish Mumbai Eenadu. She supervised the starting ceremony of Eenadu Mumbai Edition. She worked for Eenadu as Staff Reporter, as Cinema Desk In-Charge, and as Maharashtra Desk in charge. She was also Central desk in-charge for the central pages of all district editions of Eenadu daily news paper.
Journalism and T.V. Serials.

Films
Umarji Anuradha debuted with writing a script for Ye Maaya Chesave directed by Gautham Vasudev Menon, with music by A.R. Rahman. The dialogues in the movie were so phenomenally popular that the name of this movie was referred to very often with her original name. Abhinandana Awards.

She has written four T.V. serials. Then she was introduced to the film field by Manjula Ghattamaneni, the daughter of famous Telugu hero Ghattamaneni Krishna and sister of famous Telugu hero Mahesh Babu.
 The meaning of this super hit feature film Ye Maaya Chesave, is 'What magic have you done?'. It is a 2010 Telugu-language romantic drama film story written by Gautham Menon, dialogues by Umarji Anuradha and directed by Gautham Menon. The music is by A.R. Rahman.  The film stars Naga Chaitanya and Samantha Ruth Prabhu in the lead roles. It was produced by Manjula Ghattamaneni under the banner Indira Productions. Other credits include cinematography by Manoj Paramahamsa, dialogues by Umarji Anuradha and editing by Anthony Gonsalves. The film was simultaneously shot in Telugu as Ye Maaya Chesave and Tamil as Vinnaithaandi Varuvaayaa with a different cast and climax. The television rights were sold to Zee Telugu. The particular highlight of the movie is the climax part of it. Ye Maya Chesave became a super hit in Telugu language because of its very sensible dialogues with a positive climax. This film attracted the youth to movie theaters. This is the first super hit box office film for hero Naga Chaithnya and for the heroine Samantha Ruth Prabhu.  With this film, Umarji Anuradha could get attention from the film industry and immediately she got two more offers like Gaganam, Hero Nagarjuna directed by famous director Radha Mohan, and 180, Siddartha, Nithya Menon, directed by Jayendran. Maro Charithra (in Telugu language it means "Another History"): Though Maro Charithra released later, this film started prior to Ye Maya Chesave. This was directed by Ravi Yadav (cinematographer of Hindi film Race), produced by famous producer Dil Raju. Gaganam (In Telugu language Gaganam means The Sky) was directed by Radha Mohan, (Aakasham).

Personal life

Umarji Anuradha, at her 23 years old, (1993) she married her senior,  Dr Kavuri Venkata Shridhar Kumar, screen name Gautham Kashyap, a writer, poet and mimicry artist. He did PhD on The Aesthetic Methodology of Film Story, Screenplay and Direction under the guidance of Prof L.B. Sankara Rao, Presidency college and under the guidance of Director Padma Shri P. Bharathi Raja and Director Padma Shri K. Viswanath. Their marriage was performed in Tirumala Tirupati Hills on 13 August 1993 by Telugu film lyricist Sirivennela Sitarama Sasthry. The couple has one son, Naahushi Kavuri, (born 1997 March, 1st). Sridhar Kumar worked as a part-time tutor at Presidency College. Later in 1998 he joined and worked at Ramoji Film City for Ushakiron Movies Film Story Department as film story, script writer. Now they live in Hyderabad, Andhra Pradesh, India.

Writing style 

Umarji Anuradha has adopted a very common style of language and slang. She did intensive research on Telugu-speaking Malayalis Style, and Christian families' traditions in Kerala. Critiques acclaimed that the dialogues of the film were short and sweet.

Filmography

References

External links

Indian film critics
Living people
Indian women screenwriters
Telugu writers
Telugu screenwriters
Women film critics
Indian women journalists
Journalists from Andhra Pradesh
Screenwriters from Andhra Pradesh
People from Guntur district
Indian women critics
Women writers from Andhra Pradesh
21st-century Indian journalists
21st-century Indian women writers
21st-century Indian writers
21st-century Indian dramatists and playwrights
Telugu women writers
Year of birth missing (living people)
21st-century Indian screenwriters